Plagodis is a genus of moths in the family Geometridae erected by Jacob Hübner in 1825.

Selected species
 Plagodis alcoolaria Guenée, 1857) - hollow-spotted plagodis
 Plagodis dolabraria (Linnaeus, 1767) - scorched wing
 Plagodis fervidaria (Herrich-Schäffer, 1855) - fervid plagodis
 Plagodis kuetzingi (Grote, 1876) - purple plagodis
 Plagodis occiduaria Walker, 1861
 Plagodis ochraceata Viidalepp, 1988
 Plagodis phlogosaria Guenée, 1857 - scorched wing or straight-lined plagodis
 Plagodis pulveraria (Linnaeus, 1758) - barred umber
 Plagodis reticulata Warren, 1893
 Plagodis serinaria Herrich-Schaffer, 1855 - lemon plagodis

References

 

Ourapterygini
Geometridae genera
Taxa named by Jacob Hübner